Sadruddin Ahmed Chowdhury (1 January 1931 – 23 July 2016) was a Bangladeshi academic and physicist. He was one of the instrumental figures in founding Shahjalal University of Science and Technology (SUST) and served as the vice-chancellor of the university from 1989 to 1994. He also served as the vice-chancellor of Sylhet International University from 2001 to 2011.

Education and career
Chowdhury passed matriculation exam from Sylhet Government Pilot High School, Sylhet. He got his bachelor's and master's in Physics from the University of Dhaka in 1951 and 1954 respectively. He obtained his Ph.D. degree in Crystallography from the University of Manchester in 1966.

Chowdhury worked as a professor of physics at Rajshahi University and Al Fateh University. Later he joined as the vice-Chancellor of SUST in 1989. His daughter Dr. Nazia Chowdhury obtained bachelor's and master's degree in Physics from SUST, PhD from University of Cambridge and currently is a professor at SUST.

References

1931 births
2016 deaths
People from Golapganj Upazila
Academic staff of Shahjalal University of Science and Technology
Bangladeshi physicists
University of Dhaka alumni
Academic staff of the University of Rajshahi
Alumni of the University of Manchester
Vice-Chancellors of Shahjalal University of Science and Technology